Prasophyllum paulinae, commonly known as Pauline's leek orchid, is a species of orchid endemic to the south-west of Western Australia. It is a small, rare leek orchid with a single smooth, tubular leaf and up to seventy yellowish-green and purple flowers.

Description
As with others in the genus, the flowers are inverted so that the labellum is above the column rather than below it. The edges of the labellum are reddish and crinkled and there is a dark callus in its centre, extending almost to the tip. Flowering occurs from September to November and is enhanced by fires the previous summer.

Taxonomy and naming
Prasophyllum paulinae was first formally described in 1996 by David Jones and Mark Clements and the description was published in Nuytsia. The specific epithet (paulinae) honours Pauline Heberle.

Distribution and habitat
Pauline's leek orchid grows with grasses and sedges in swamps near Albany in the Jarrah Forest biogeographic region.

Conservation
Prasophyllum paulinae is classified as "Priority One" by the Government of Western Australia Department of Parks and Wildlife meaning that it is known from only one or a few locations which are potentially at risk.

References

External links 
 

paulinae
Endemic flora of Western Australia
Endemic orchids of Australia
Plants described in 1996